In number theory and combinatorics, a partition of a positive integer , also called an integer partition, is a way of writing  as a sum of positive integers. Two sums that differ only in the order of their summands are considered the same partition. (If order matters, the sum becomes a composition.)  For example,  can be partitioned in five distinct ways:

An individual summand in a partition is called a part. So .

Partitions can be graphically visualized with Young diagrams or Ferrers diagrams. They occur in a number of branches of mathematics and physics, including the study of symmetric polynomials and of the symmetric group and in group representation theory in general.

Examples
The seven partitions of 5 are
 5
 4 + 1
 3 + 2
 3 + 1 + 1
 2 + 2 + 1
 2 + 1 + 1 + 1
 1 + 1 + 1 + 1 + 1

Some authors treat a partition as a decreasing sequence of summands, rather than an expression with plus signs. For example, the partition 2 + 2 + 1 might instead be written as the tuple  or in the even more compact form  where the superscript indicates the number of repetitions of a part.

(Components with  may be omitted.)

Diagrammatic representations of partitions
There are two common diagrammatic methods to represent partitions: as Ferrers diagrams, named after Norman Macleod Ferrers, and as Young diagrams, named after Alfred Young.  Both have several possible conventions; here, we use English notation, with diagrams aligned in the upper-left corner.

Ferrers diagram  
The partition 6 + 4 + 3 + 1 of the number 14 can be represented by the following diagram:

The 14 circles are lined up in 4 rows, each having the size of a part of the partition. The diagrams for the 5 partitions of the number 4 are shown below:

Young diagram

An alternative visual representation of an integer partition is its Young diagram (often also called a Ferrers diagram).  Rather than representing a partition with dots, as in the Ferrers diagram, the Young diagram uses boxes or squares.  Thus, the Young diagram for the partition 5 + 4 + 1 is

while the Ferrers diagram for the same partition is
{|
|- style="vertical-align:top; text-align:left;"
| 
|- style="vertical-align:top; text-align:center;"
|}

While this seemingly trivial variation does not appear worthy of separate mention, Young diagrams turn out to be extremely useful in the study of symmetric functions and group representation theory: filling the boxes of Young diagrams with numbers (or sometimes more complicated objects) obeying various rules leads to a family of objects called Young tableaux, and these tableaux have combinatorial and representation-theoretic significance. As a type of shape made by adjacent squares joined together, Young diagrams are a special kind of polyomino.

Partition function

The partition function  equals the number of possible partitions of a non-negative integer .
1, 1, 2, 3, 5, 7, 11, 15, 22, 30, 42, 56, 77, 101, 135, 176, 231, 297, 385, 490, 627, 792, 1002, 1255, 1575, 1958, 2436, 3010, 3718, 4565, 5604, ... .

No closed-form expression for the partition function is known, but it has both asymptotic expansions that accurately approximate it and recurrence relations by which it can be calculated exactly. It grows as an exponential function of the square root of its argument., as follows:

 as 

The multiplicative inverse of its generating function is the Euler function; by Euler's pentagonal number theorem this function is an alternating sum of pentagonal number powers of its argument.

Srinivasa Ramanujan discovered that the partition function has nontrivial patterns in modular arithmetic, now known as Ramanujan's congruences. For instance, whenever the decimal representation of  ends in the digit 4 or 9, the number of partitions of  will be divisible by 5.

Restricted partitions
In both combinatorics and number theory, families of partitions subject to various restrictions are often studied.  This section surveys a few such restrictions.

Conjugate and self-conjugate partitions

If we flip the diagram of the partition 6 + 4 + 3 + 1 along its main diagonal, we obtain another partition of 14:

By turning the rows into columns, we obtain the partition 4 + 3 + 3 + 2 + 1 + 1 of the number 14. Such partitions are said to be conjugate of one another. In the case of the number 4, partitions 4 and 1 + 1 + 1 + 1 are conjugate pairs, and partitions 3 + 1 and 2 + 1 + 1 are conjugate of each other. Of particular interest is the partition 2 + 2, which has itself as conjugate. Such a partition is said to be self-conjugate.

Claim: The number of self-conjugate partitions is the same as the number of partitions with distinct odd parts.

Proof (outline): The crucial observation is that every odd part can be "folded" in the middle to form a self-conjugate diagram:

One can then obtain a bijection between the set of partitions with distinct odd parts and the set of self-conjugate partitions, as illustrated by the following example:

Odd parts and distinct parts 
Among the 22 partitions of the number 8, there are 6 that contain only odd parts:
 7 + 1
 5 + 3
 5 + 1 + 1 + 1
 3 + 3 + 1 + 1
 3 + 1 + 1 + 1 + 1 + 1
 1 + 1 + 1 + 1 + 1 + 1 + 1 + 1

Alternatively, we could count partitions in which no number occurs more than once. Such a partition is called a partition with distinct parts. If we count the partitions of 8 with distinct parts, we also obtain 6:
 8
 7 + 1 
 6 + 2
 5 + 3
 5 + 2 + 1
 4 + 3 + 1

This is a general property.  For each positive number, the number of partitions with odd parts equals the number of partitions with distinct parts, denoted by q(n). This result was proved by Leonhard Euler in 1748 and later was generalized as Glaisher's theorem.

For every type of restricted partition there is a corresponding function for the number of partitions satisfying the given restriction. An important example is q(n) (partitions into distinct parts).  The first few values of q(n) are (starting with q(0)=1):
1, 1, 1, 2, 2, 3, 4, 5, 6, 8, 10, ... .

The generating function for q(n) is given by 

The pentagonal number theorem gives a recurrence for q: 
q(k) = ak + q(k − 1) + q(k − 2) − q(k − 5) − q(k − 7) + q(k − 12) + q(k − 15) − q(k − 22) − ...
where ak is (−1)m if k = 3m2 − m for some integer m and is 0 otherwise.

Restricted part size or number of parts

The function  satisfies the recurrence
 

One recovers the function p(n) by

One possible generating function for such partitions, taking k fixed and n variable, is 
 

More generally, if T is a set of positive integers then the number of partitions of n, all of whose parts belong to T, has generating function 

This can be used to solve change-making problems (where the set T specifies the available coins).  As two particular cases, one has that the number of partitions of n in which all parts are 1 or 2 (or, equivalently, the number of partitions of n into 1 or 2 parts) is

and the number of partitions of n in which all parts are 1, 2 or 3 (or, equivalently, the number of partitions of n into at most three parts) is the nearest integer to (n + 3)2 / 12.

Partitions in a rectangle and Gaussian binomial coefficients

One may also simultaneously limit the number and size of the parts. Equivalently, these are the partitions whose Young diagram fits inside an  rectangle. There is a recurrence relation

obtained by observing that  counts the partitions of  into exactly  parts of size at most , and subtracting 1 from each part of such a partition yields a partition of  into at most  parts.

The Gaussian binomial coefficient is defined as:

Rank and Durfee square

The rank of a partition is the largest number k such that the partition contains at least k parts of size at least k.  For example, the partition 4 + 3 + 3 + 2 + 1 + 1 has rank 3 because it contains 3 parts that are ≥ 3, but does not contain 4 parts that are ≥ 4.  In the Ferrers diagram or Young diagram of a partition of rank r, the r × r square of entries in the upper-left is known as the Durfee square:

{|
|- style="vertical-align:top; text-align:left;"
| 
|}

The Durfee square has applications within combinatorics in the proofs of various partition identities.  It also has some practical significance in the form of the h-index.

A different statistic is also sometimes called the rank of a partition (or Dyson rank), namely, the difference  for a partition of k parts with largest part .  This statistic (which is unrelated to the one described above) appears in the study of Ramanujan congruences.

Young's lattice

There is a natural partial order on partitions given by inclusion of Young diagrams.  This partially ordered set is known as Young's lattice.  The lattice was originally defined in the context of representation theory, where it is used to describe the irreducible representations of symmetric groups Sn for all n, together with their branching properties, in characteristic zero.  It also has received significant study for its purely combinatorial properties; notably, it is the motivating example of a differential poset.

See also 

 Rank of a partition, a different notion of rank
 Crank of a partition
 Dominance order
 Factorization
 Integer factorization
 Partition of a set
 Stars and bars (combinatorics)
 Plane partition
 Polite number, defined by partitions into consecutive integers
 Multiplicative partition
 Twelvefold way
 Ewens's sampling formula
 Faà di Bruno's formula
 Multipartition
 Newton's identities
 Smallest-parts function
 A Goldbach partition is the partition of an even number into primes (see Goldbach's conjecture)
 Kostant's partition function

Notes

References 
 
 
 
   (See chapter 5 for a modern pedagogical intro to Rademacher's formula).
  (an elementary introduction to the topic of integer partitions, including a discussion of Ferrers graphs)
 
  Provides the main formula (no derivatives), remainder, and older form for Ak(n).)
  (Has text, nearly complete bibliography, but they (and Abramowitz) missed the Selberg formula for Ak(n), which is in Whiteman.)
  (See section I.1)
 
 
 
 
  (Provides the Selberg formula. The older form is the finite Fourier expansion of Selberg.)

External links 
 
 Partition and composition calculator
 
 Wilf, Herbert S. 
 Counting with partitions with reference tables to the On-Line Encyclopedia of Integer Sequences
 Integer partitions entry in the FindStat database
 Integer::Partition Perl module from CPAN
 Fast Algorithms For Generating Integer Partitions
 Generating All Partitions: A Comparison Of Two Encodings